The dropper loop is a type of loop knot often used on multi-hook fishing lines.  It can be created in the middle of a long line and forms a loop which is off to the side of the line.

Techniques 
There are two main methods of tying the dropper loop.  
 Gather a loop and then twist it around the overlap a few times
 Form the loop and then use a matchstick to twist up the overlap.
Finally drop the loop through the central twist.

See also
List of knots

References